The North Caribbean Coast Autonomous Regional Council is the devolved legislature of the North Caribbean Coast Autonomous Region. It has the power to legislate on a wide variety of economic, social, and cultural issues not reserved to the central government.

References 

North Caribbean Coast Autonomous Region
South Caribbean Coast Autonomous Region
Departments of Nicaragua
Government of Nicaragua
Politics of Nicaragua
Unicameral legislatures
Nicaragua